Alfons Bierebeek (born 10 June 1934) is a Belgian former swimmer. He competed in the men's 4 × 200 metre freestyle relay at the 1952 Summer Olympics.

References

External links
 

1934 births
Living people
Olympic swimmers of Belgium
Swimmers at the 1952 Summer Olympics
Place of birth missing (living people)
Belgian male freestyle swimmers